Christian-Vodou relations describe the relationship between Christianity and certain African diaspora religions, including Haitian Vodou and Louisiana Voodoo, and have been marked by syncretism and conflicts, especially in Haiti, but less so in Louisiana and elsewhere.

Christian and Vodou conflicts
The revolutionary Jean-Jacques Dessalines presumptively proclaimed himself head of the church in Haiti after the Haitian Revolution. He set forward to limit the jurisdiction of priests and to appoint men to vacant positions in local church communities. He himself had caused the assassination of a large number of the missionaries by failing to stop slaughter of the white colonists. This caused a schism between the Haitian state and Rome, resulting in Rome's declining to send priests into the country. There were no priests to provide guidelines for the newly established Haitian state. As a consequence, the principles of Vodou and Catholicism were merged and Catholicism (with its Vodou influences) was made the state's official religion under the leadership of Henri Christophe.

Another cause of the syncretic connection between Catholicism and Vodou was the state's ordination of Haitian men to the priesthood – a step that the Vatican would not recognize as legitimate. However, mixture of both religions shaped the way of how Haitians practice their ritual. The Haitians were going to church, but they continued to adhere to Vodou, using the rituals of the church to mask the practices of their native traditions.

There have been several killings in the past of Christian pastors, and some Christians blame those murders on the influence of Vodou. There have also been several murders of Vodou Priests/Priestesses, most recently after the earthquake. In Haiti, some Christians consider Vodou a form of devil worship.  In spite of this criticism by some Haitian Christians, many practitioners of Haitian Vodou continue to self-identify as Roman Catholic, even to the point of incorporating the Lord's Prayer and the Hail Mary into their services for the Lwa (also called loa). These people see no contradiction between the two faiths and, in fact, view it as enriching their own faith, such people refer to themselves as good Christians.

The Christian population of Haiti often uses Vodou as a scapegoat for Haiti's problems including the devastating 2010 earthquake and the poor economic state of Haiti today.
Extremist Christian groups in Haiti have sought to rid the country of Vodou completely as they believe Vodou practitioners are influenced by demonic forces. Some Christians deem the earthquake a punishment, because they believe that the portion of Haiti who practice Vodou made a deal with the devil.

Syncretism
At this point, the exact number of Vodou followers and Christians in Haiti is unknown. Many Christians accept Vodou as part of the country's culture, though most Evangelical Christians consider Vodou incompatible with Christianity, though not universally.

Vodou is an established religion. False representations in the media have led it to be considered "black magic," but its adherents recognize it as an official religion. (or at least not primarily, see bokor). Many observances are shared between the religions; for instance it is not abnormal for Vodou funerary ceremonies to be performed, followed by a Roman Catholic ceremony presided by a priest. Many Haitians celebrate Christian holidays alongside traditional Vodou holidays. As a whole it is a complex relationship where some consider the theologies to be incompatible, whereas others indeed view them as compatible.

Vodou draws influences from a multitude of other religions and cultures, particularly Catholicism despite the counter-position between the two religions. Over the centuries, Vodou was shaped into the wide-reaching and unique religion that it is today.

Some practices of Haitian Vodou are a result of the syncretism that occurred when the French colonizers forcibly converted West African slaves in the West Indies colonies to Christianity. Instead of completely converting to Christianity, the African slaves disguised their loa as acceptable Catholic saints. This way, they were able to continue to practice their traditional religion. This new form of the tribal African religions came to be Haitian Vodou which to this day still has its Christian influences. 
Despite the constant opposition between Christianity and Vodou, many Haitians often consider themselves practitioners of both Vodou and Christianity.

Louisiana Vodou/New Orleans Vodou is another example of syncretism with Christianity and West African culture.

The Church position
During the colonial period, the Catholic Church first altered the traditional African traditions that would eventually become Haitian Vodou through slavery and forced Christianization. Missionaries sought to end any African influence on slaves in the New World to fully convert them to Christianity.
The Church has put pressure upon the government to outlaw and disband Vodou. In 1896, 1913, and again in 1941 the church led its anti-superstitious campaigns to fight against Voodooism. During the campaigns, hundreds of Ounfos and ritual paraphernalia were destroyed and burned. In addition to the more common French and British missionaries, Canadian missionaries began to move into Haiti in 1942. A Jesuit seminary was also opened in 1948. Up to this time, the church remains a major political power; this can cause major problems in country and has greatly limited its pastoral work. In the past decade the Catholic Church has taken a much more liberal stand towards Vodou, even including some minor Vodou elements in the Haitian mass.

See also
Haitian Vodou
Louisiana Voodoo

References

Haitian Vodou
Christianity and religious syncretism